Alfred Arthur Greenwood Hales (21 July 1860 – 29 December 1936) was an Australian novelist and war correspondent.

Hales was born at Kent Town, Adelaide, the son of Frederick Greenwood Hales, a wood-turner, and his wife Sarah Leigh, née Veal. He had the ordinary primary education of his time, and after being apprenticed to a carpenter began a wandering career by going to the country. For years he worked as a farm hand and rouseabout and became a magnificent rider. He occasionally contributed to country newspapers, never staying long in one place, until he came to Broken Hill, New South Wales, where he was a mining reporter for some years. There he wrote his first book, The Wanderings of a Simple Child, which was published in 1890. This went into a third edition in the following year. Hales then visited America and England and returning to Adelaide started the Adelaide Standard. He next went to the goldfields in Western Australia and started the Coolgardie Mining Review. A fire destroyed his plant and he was penniless, but after working for some time as a dry-blower he went to Boulder and with his brother Frank started the Boulder Star and later the Boulder Miner's Right. Hales stood as a labour candidate for parliament but was defeated, and when the South African war broke out became a war correspondent for the London Daily News. For a time he wrote fearlessly and critically of the way in which the British were conducting their operations, but was wounded and made a prisoner by the Boers, and was not released until the end of the war.

Hales wrote a book on his experiences, Campaign Pictures of War in South Africa, (1900), and in the following year appeared his first novel, Driscoll, King of Scouts. He made a success with McGlusky, published in 1902, afterwards followed by a long series of stories with this Australian of Scottish descent as the hero.

Hales was not content to be merely a writer of fiction, he went to Bulgaria and fought in the Ilinden–Preobrazhenie Uprising against the Turks in 1903 in the band of general Ivan Tsonchev – the leader of the Supreme Macedonian-Adrianople Committee. This was followed by experience as a war correspondent in the Russo-Japanese War, and in the following years much lecturing in England, South Africa, Australia and South America. Wherever there was a mining field Hales visited it, and in South America he made a special study of the agricultural and pastoral possibilities of that continent. When World War I began he endeavoured to enlist but was too much over age. Hales worked as a war correspondent in France, and then went to Italy, where he met General Garibaldi and endeavoured to join the Italian army. Garibaldi, who was born in Australia, tried to help him without success, and Hales again worked as a correspondent. In 1918 he published Where Angels Fear to Tread, a series of able sketches on matters arising out of the war. After peace came Hales lived mostly in England and wrote a large number of novels, of which about 60 are listed in Miller's Australian Literature. Many of these had large circulations; of the McGlusky series of some 20 volumes about 2,000,000 copies were sold. Hales published a volume of verse, Poems and Ballads, in 1909, which is not important as poetry, and he also wrote some unpublished plays. He died in England on 29 December 1936. He was married twice; firstly to Emmeline Pritchard of Adelaide who died in 1911, and secondly in 1920 to Jean Reid. There were four sons and a daughter by the first marriage.

Hales was a large man known to all as "Smiler" Hales. He took part in and was much interested in every form of sport. He was a good journalist and a good teller of tales, who believed in wholesome decent living and was not afraid to say so. His My Life of Adventure, 1918, and Broken Trails, 1931, show interesting adventures from his life.

References

Donald Grant, 'Hales, Alfred Arthur Greenwood (1860–1936)', Australian Dictionary of Biography, Vol. 9, MUP, 1983, pp 159–160

External links
 
 

1860 births
1936 deaths
20th-century Australian novelists
20th-century Australian male writers
Australian journalists
Australian male novelists